James Barry Daly (born 19 March 1980) is a British Conservative Party  politician who has been the member of Parliament (MP) for Bury North since the 2019 general election.

Early life 
Daly practised criminal law as a solicitor for the defence, based in Greater Manchester for 16 years prior to becoming an MP.

Political career 
He was previously the leader of the Conservative Group on Bury Council and since 2012, has been the councillor for the North Manor ward in Bury North. Daly stood in neighbouring Bolton North East at the 2015 and 2017 general elections, coming second with 32.8% and 42.2% of the vote respectively. He also stood at the 2015 Oldham West and Royton by-election, finishing third with 2,596 votes (9.4%).

At the 2019 general election, he stood for Bury North, where he won the seat from Labour incumbent James Frith with a majority of 0.2%, representing a swing of 4.7%. With a majority of 105 votes, it is the most marginal seat in England.

He is an advocate of the Down Syndrome Bill, which would recognise people with Down syndrome as a specific minority group.

On 13 June 2022, Daly was appointed Parliamentary Private Secretary to the Department for Work and Pensions ministerial team. He resigned from his position on 6 July 2022 following the Chris Pincher scandal, amid the July 2022 United Kingdom government crisis.

References

External links

Living people
UK MPs 2019–present
Conservative Party (UK) councillors
Conservative Party (UK) MPs for English constituencies
21st-century English politicians
1980 births
Councillors in Greater Manchester